Luigi Galvani or simply Galvani was the name of at least two ships of the Italian Navy named in honour of Luigi Galvani and may refer to:

 , a  launched in 1918 and discarded in 1938.
 , a  launched in 1938 and sunk in 1940.

Italian Navy ship names